Moodys is an unincorporated community in Cherokee County, Oklahoma, United States. Moodys has a post office with ZIP code 74444, which opened on March 21, 1896.

Demographics

References

Unincorporated communities in Cherokee County, Oklahoma
Unincorporated communities in Oklahoma